The 1957 Guild of Television Producers and Directors Awards were the third annual giving of the awards which later became known as the British Academy Television Awards.

Winners
Actor
Michael Gough
Actress
Rosalie Crutchley
Designer
Reece Pemberton
Personality
Christopher Chataway
Production
Joy Harington
Scriptwriter
Spike Milligan
Writers Award
Spike Milligan

References
Archive of winners on official BAFTA website (retrieved February 19, 2006).

British Academy Film Awards
Guild of Television Producers and Directors Awards
Guild of Television Producers and Directors Awards
Guild of Television Producers and Directors Awards